Mirza Sultan Raja (4 September 1937 – 17 November 2013) was a Jatiya Samajtantrik Dal (Siraj) politician and the former Member of Parliament of Chuadanga-2.

Career
Raja was a veteran of Bangladesh liberation war. He was elected to parliament from Chuadanga-2 as a Jatiya Samajtantrik Dal candidate in 1986. He contested the 1996 and 2001 elections as a Bangladesh Awami League candidate but lost both elections.

References

Jatiya Samajtantrik Dal (Siraj) politicians
3rd Jatiya Sangsad members
1937 births
2013 deaths
Awami League politicians